Charles Edward Clark (December 9, 1889 – December 13, 1963) was Dean of Yale Law School and a United States circuit judge of the United States Court of Appeals for the Second Circuit.

Education and career

Born on December 9, 1889, in Woodbridge, Connecticut, to Samuel Orman Clark and Pauline C. Marquand, Clark received a Bachelor of Arts degree in 1911 from Yale University. He received a Bachelor of Laws in 1913 from Yale Law School. He entered private practice in New Haven, Connecticut from 1913 to 1919. He was a member of the Connecticut House of Representatives from 1917 to 1918, and was Republican. He was a Professor of Law at Yale Law School from 1919 to 1929. He was a Deputy Judge of the Hamden, Connecticut Town Court from 1927 to 1931. He was the Sterling Professor of Law and Dean of Yale Law School from 1929 to 1939. He was Special Assistant Attorney General for the Antitrust Division of the United States Department of Justice in 1938.

Federal judicial service

Clark was nominated by President Franklin D. Roosevelt on January 5, 1939, to the United States Court of Appeals for the Second Circuit, to a new seat authorized by 52 Stat. 584. He was confirmed by the United States Senate on March 7, 1939, and received his commission on March 9, 1939. He served as Chief Judge and as a member of the Judicial Conference of the United States from 1954 to 1959. His service terminated on December 13, 1963, due to his death in Hamden.

Other service

Clark was a visiting lecturer in law at Yale University from 1951 to 1963.

References

Sources

Further reading
 

1889 births
1963 deaths
People from Woodbridge, Connecticut
Yale Law School alumni
Connecticut state court judges
Republican Party members of the Connecticut House of Representatives
Judges of the United States Court of Appeals for the Second Circuit
United States court of appeals judges appointed by Franklin D. Roosevelt
20th-century American judges
Deans of Yale Law School
Yale Sterling Professors